is an interchange passenger railway station located in Naka-ku, Yokohama, Japan, operated by East Japan Railway Company (JR East) and the Yokohama Municipal Subway.

Lines

Station layout

JR East

The JR East station consists of two elevated island platforms serving three tracks.

The station has two sets of ticket barriers ("North" and "South" gates), with entrances on the east and west sides (four in total). The station has a "Midori no Madoguchi" staffed ticket office, next to the South gate.

Yokohama Municipal Subway
The Yokohama Municipal Subway (Blue Line) platforms are located on the 4th basement level, south of the main station.

Yokohama Air Cabin
This transit is a ropeway, but it is a new type transportation in urban area. The ropeway connects Sakuragichō Station with Unga Park where is located near Yokohama Red Brick Warehouse and Yokohama Cosmo World at 1000 yen from 22 April 2021. Senyo Kōgyō constructed the similar ropeway when YOKOHAMA EXOTIC SHOWCASE '89 was held in 1989.

History
Sakuragichō is one of Japan's oldest stations. It opened on 12 June 1872, as the original Yokohama Station when the service between Shinagawa and Yokohama provisionally started. The station was renamed Sakuragichō Station on 15 August 1915, when the then-new and second Yokohama Station opened near Takashimachō Station. Yokohama Station was relocated again after the 1923 Great Kantō earthquake, to its third and current location.

Between 31 March 1932, and 30 January 2004, Sakuragichō Station was the terminus of the Tokyu Toyoko Line.

The north gate ticket barriers were opened on 1 July 2014, with the passageway linking the east and west sides opened to the public on 16 July. A new commercial and shopping complex, called "Cial", adjoining the north side of the station was also opened at the same time.

Accidents

On 24 April 1951, a 63 series Keihin Line (now part of the Negishi Line) train approaching the station caught fire when the train hit a loose overhead wire and caused a short circuit. The fire killed 106 and injured 92.

Passenger statistics
In fiscal 2019, the station was used by an average of 70,797 passengers daily (boarding passengers only). During the same period, the Yokohama Municipal Subway by an average of 19,767 passengers daily, (boarding passengers only).

The daily average passenger figures (boarding passengers only) for previous years are as shown below.

Surrounding area
The station is located near the Minato Mirai 21 district and Yokohama Landmark Tower. Other stations in the vicinity include Minatomirai Station on the Minatomirai Line.

See also
 List of railway stations in Japan

References

External links

 JR East Sakuragichō Station  
 Yokohama Subway Sakuragichō Station
 Bus Terminals at Yokohama & Sakuragichō Stations
 Sightseeing areas near Sakuragichō Station

Railway stations in Kanagawa Prefecture
Naka-ku, Yokohama
Negishi Line
Blue Line (Yokohama)
Stations of East Japan Railway Company
Stations of Yokohama City Transportation Bureau
Railway stations in Yokohama
Railway stations in Japan opened in 1872